Spook Busters is a 1946 film directed by William Beaudine and starring the comedy team of The Bowery Boys. It is the fourth film in the series of forty eight.

Plot
All of the boys have just graduated from school where they learned exterminating, except for Sach who flunked out.  They set up their new business in a corner of Louie's Sweet Shop and quickly get a job to remove ghosts from an old abandoned mansion.  Upon arrival they discover weird events taking place, such as lights turning on when a match is lit, and a disappearing organ.  Soon they discover that these events are not the actions of ghosts, but of a mad scientist who is conducting illegal experiments in the basement.

Upon encountering the scientist, Sach quickly becomes part of the experiment when the scientist wants to take part of his brain out and put it into a gorilla.  A fight ensues and, after the cops arrive and apprehend the criminals, the boys find themselves at the police station telling the story of what happened.  Louie then calls them and tells Slip that the mouse in his store "had puppies" and the boys quickly leave the police station to go to their next job.

Cast

The Bowery Boys
 Leo Gorcey as Terrance 'Slip' Mahoney
 Huntz Hall as Sach
 Bobby Jordan as Bobby
 William Benedict as Whitey
 David Gorcey as Chuck

Remaining cast
 Gabriel Dell as Gabe
 Bernard Gorcey as Louie Dumbrowski
 Douglass Dumbrille as Dr. Coslow
 Tanis Chandler as Mignon
 Maurice Cass as Dr. Bender
 Charles Middleton as Stiles
 Richard Alexander as Ivan

Production
Gabriel Dell makes his first appearance of the series, playing an old member of the gang who just returned from a stint in the Navy and newly married to a French woman.

The film was made under the working title Ghost Busters.

Home media
Released on VHS by Warner Brothers on September 1, 1998.

Warner Archives released the film on made-to-order DVD in the United States as part of "The Bowery Boys, Volume Two" on April 9, 2013.

See also
 Lonesome Ghosts, a 1937 Disney short with a similar premise

References

External links 
 
 
 
 

1946 films
1940s comedy horror films
American comedy horror films
American black-and-white films
Bowery Boys films
1940s English-language films
Films directed by William Beaudine
American haunted house films
Mad scientist films
Monogram Pictures films
1946 horror films
1946 comedy films
1940s American films